Yolanda Tortolero Martínez (died 18 May 2021) was a Venezuelan physician and politician, alternate deputy of the National Assembly for the Carabobo state and the A New Era party.

Career 
Tortolero was a physician by profession and worked at the Bejuma Hospital for several years, a town in the Carabobo state where she was from. She was elected as alternate deputy for the National Assembly for Carabobo for the period 2016–2021 in the 2015 parliamentary elections, representing the Democratic Unity Roundtable (MUD) and the A New Era (UNT in Spanish) party. In 2020 she was one of the 100 deputies to vote in person in favor of reelecting Juan Guaidó as president of the Assembly in the National Assembly Delegated Committee election.

In 2021 she was hospitalized in San Felipe, Yaracuy state; her party, colleagues and inhabitants of Bejuma asked for financial assistance for her medical attention. Although her death had originally been reported by 14 May, the regional executive board of UNT in Carabobo informed that by that date the parliamentarian was still alive. After fighting against COVID-19 for about three weeks, Tortolero died on 18 May from complications derived from the disease.

See also 
 IV National Assembly of Venezuela

References

External links 
 Yolanda Tortolero Martinez - National Assembly Venezuela

Year of birth missing
20th-century births
2021 deaths
Venezuelan women physicians
21st-century Venezuelan women politicians
21st-century Venezuelan politicians
Members of the National Assembly (Venezuela)
Deaths from the COVID-19 pandemic in Venezuela
People from San Felipe, Venezuela